Arthur Burrows may refer to:

 Arthur Burrows (radio broadcaster), early employee of the British Broadcasting Company
 Arthur Burrows (footballer) (born 1919), former English footballer
 Arthur Burrows (English cricketer) (1865–1890), English cricketer
 Arthur Burrows (Australian cricketer) (1903–1984), Australian cricketer